Progressive Union may refer to:
 Progressive Union (Benin)
 Progressive Union (France)
 Progressive Union (Greece)
 Progressive Valdostan Union (1973), Italy
 Progressive Valdostan Union (2013), Italy
 Progressive Union of Menorca, Spain

See also 
 Progressive Party (disambiguation)